Lin Shusen (born December 1946) is a politician of the People's Republic of China.  He was Governor and Deputy Communist Party Chief of Guizhou Province from 2006 to 2010.  Prior to that he was Communist Party Chief and Mayor of Guangzhou, capital of Guangdong Province.

Biography
Lin was born in Shantou, Guangdong, and graduated from the Guangdong University of Technology. He has served as the secretary of the CPC Guangzhou municipal committee, and the chairman of the standing committee of the Guangzhou People's Congress. 

He has been an alternate member of the 16th Central Committee of the Communist Party of China, and a full member of the 17th Central Committee of the Communist Party of China.

External links
 Lin Shusen's profile at xinhuanet.com

1946 births
Living people
People's Republic of China politicians from Guangdong
Politicians from Shantou
Chinese Communist Party politicians from Guangdong
Political office-holders in Guangxi
Governors of Guizhou
South China University of Technology alumni